The following lists events that happened during 2014 in Yemen.

Incumbents
President: Abd Rabbuh Mansur Hadi

Events

January
 January 8 - Two suspected al-Qaeda militants are killed in a U.S. drone strike in the southeastern province of Hadhramaut.
 January 18 - An Iranian diplomat is killed in Sana'a when he resisted gunmen who were trying to kidnap him near the ambassador's residence.
 January 31 - 15 soldiers are killed and four wounded by suspected al-Qaeda militants in an attack on an army checkpoint in southeastern Yemen.

February
 February 2 - Three explosions are reported in Sana'a along with heavy gunfire.
 February 10 - A presidential panel in Yemen agrees to transform the country into a federation of six regions.

March
 March 9 - At least 42 migrants from the Horn of Africa drown when their boat overturns off the coast of Shabwah Governorate.
 March 24 - Twenty soldiers are killed in an attack on a military checkpoint.

April
 April 4 - Suspected al-Qaeda militants attack an army post in Hadramawt province killing at least eight soldiers and injuring eleven.
 April 21 - 30 suspected al-Qaeda militants and 6 civilians are killed in a drone strike by the United States.
 April 30 - At least 30 people have been killed in clashes between al-Qaeda and the Yemen Army.

May
 May 9 - Yemeni security forces announce that they have killed Shayef Mohammed Saeed Al-Shabwani, an al-Qaeda terrorist wanted over a series of attacks in Sana'a.
 May 14 - Seven Yemeni Army soldiers and 16 Al-Qaeda in the Arabian Peninsula militants are killed in fighting near the town of Azan in Shabwa province.
 May 20 - At least 16 people are killed in clashes between Shi'ite Muslim tribesmen and Yemeni government forces and allied Sunni tribesmen.
 May 24 - At least 27 people are killed in an al-Qaeda raid on the town of Seyoun in Hadramout province.
 May 25 - The Yemeni Military kills 5 al-Qaeda militants and arrests 4 in a raid north of Sana'a.

June
 June 5 - An attack on a Yemeni military checkpoint by suspected al-Qaeda militants in Shabwah Governorate leaves 14 people dead.
 June 11 - The entire country of Yemen remains without electricity for a second day after insurgents sabotaged power lines linking the capital Sana'a and the contested Ma'rib Governorate.
 June 15 - 7 people are killed in Aden after a gunman opens fire on a minibus.

August
 August 7 - Yemeni forces kill at least seven al-Qaeda militants in the Wadi Hadramout region.

November
 November 1 - Clashes between al-Qaeda and security forces leave 20 soldiers and 3 militants dead in Hodeidah province.
 November 5 - A US drone strike kills five Al Qaeda in the Arabian Peninsula operatives including Shawki al-Badani and Nabil al-Dahab, leader of Ansar al-Sharia in Al Bayda Governorate.
 November 12 - Fighting between Houthi rebels and Ansar al-Sharia-backed Sunni tribes have left at least 33 dead in Al Bayda' Governorate.
 November 12 - A U.S. drone strike kills seven al-Qaeda militants in the south.
 November 25 - A joint operation by U.S. and Yemeni special operations forces on an al-Qaeda hideout in eastern Yemen rescues 8 hostages and leaves 7 militants dead.

December
 December 6 - An American civilian and a South African civilian die during an attempt to rescue them by U.S. Navy SEALs in Yemen. They were being held hostage by al-Qaeda in the Arabian Peninsula.
 December 6 - At least 70 drown when a migrant boat from Ethiopia sinks off the Red Sea coast of Yemen.
 December 9 - An Ansar al-Sharia suicide bomb attack kills seven soldiers at an army base in southern Yemen.
 December 16 - A pair of car bombs kill 20 children and 11 Houthi militants in Radaa.
 December 31 - At least 26 people are killed in a suicide bombing in Ibb.

References

 
Yemen
Yemen
Years of the 21st century in Yemen
2010s in Yemen